The 1855 Newfoundland general election was held in 1855 to elect members of the 6th General Assembly of Newfoundland. This was the first election after responsible government was introduced to Newfoundland Colony. The Liberal Party led by Philip Francis Little formed the government.

 Fogo
 William Henry Ellis Conservative
 William Whiteway Conservative, elected in 1858
 Thomas Knight Conservative
 Bonavista Bay
 Robert Carter Conservative
 John H. Warren Conservative
 Matthew W. Walbank Conservative
 Trinity Bay
 Stephen March Conservative
 John Winter Conservative
 F.B.T. Carter Conservative
 Bay de Verde
 John Bemister Conservative
 Carbonear
 Edmund Hanrahan Liberal
 Harbour Grace
 James L. Prendergast Liberal
 John Hayward Conservative
 Brigus-Port de Grave
 Robert Brown Conservative
 St. John's East
 John Kent Liberal
 Robert J. Parsons Liberal
 Peter Winser Liberal
 John Kavanagh Liberal, elected in 1857
 St. John's West
 John Fox Liberal
 John Casey Liberal, elected in 1857
 Ambrose Shea Liberal (speaker)
 P.F. Little Liberal
 J. J. Gearin, elected in 1858
 Harbour Main
 Thomas Byrne Liberal
 William Talbot Liberal
 Ferryland
 Thomas Glen Conservative
 Edward D. Shea Liberal
 Placentia and St. Mary's
 George J. Hogsett Liberal
 Michael John Kelly Liberal
 John Delaney Liberal
 Burin
 Clement Benning Liberal
 Patrick Morris Liberal
 Fortune Bay
 Hugh W. Hoyles Conservative
 Burgeo-LaPoile
 Robert Henry Prowse Conservative

References 
 

1855
1855 elections in North America
1855 elections in Canada
Pre-Confederation Newfoundland
1855 in Newfoundland